2016 Yokohama FC season.

Squad
As of 19 February 2016.

J2 League

References

External links
 J.League official site

Yokohama FC
Yokohama FC seasons